Kristin Mürer Stemland (born 8 January 1981) is a Norwegian cross-country skier.

Born in Trondheim, her club is Byåsen IL.

At the 2006 Winter Olympics in Turin, Stemland finished 5th in women's 4 × 5 km relay with the Norwegian team. She participated at the 2007-08 Cross-country Skiing World Cup, and won one of the relays.

Cross-country skiing results
All results are sourced from the International Ski Federation (FIS).

Olympic Games

World Championships

World Cup

Season standings

Team podiums

 2 victories
 4 podiums

References

External links

1981 births
Living people
Norwegian female cross-country skiers
Olympic cross-country skiers of Norway
Cross-country skiers at the 2006 Winter Olympics
Sportspeople from Trondheim